This is a list of 339 species in Sapromyza, a genus of flies in the family Lauxaniidae.

Sapromyza species

 Sapromyza abhorens Shatalkin, 1993 c g
 Sapromyza acrostichalis Sasakawa, 2001 c g
 Sapromyza adriani Baez, 2000 c g
 Sapromyza affra Rondani, 1863 c g
 Sapromyza afghanica Papp, 1979 c g
 Sapromyza agromyzina (Kertesz, 1913) c g
 Sapromyza alazonica Shatalkin, 1993 c g
 Sapromyza albibasis Sasakawa, 1995 c g
 Sapromyza albiceps Fallén, 1820
 Sapromyza albicincta (Meijere, 1916) c g
 Sapromyza albifacies Czerny, 1932 c g
 Sapromyza albipes Coquillett, 1904 c g
 Sapromyza albitarsis (Meigen, 1826) c g
 Sapromyza alboatra Malloch, 1926 c g
 Sapromyza albuliceps Czerny, 1932
 Sapromyza alpina Merz, 2007 c g
 Sapromyza amabilis Frey, 1930
 Sapromyza amphibola Shatalkin, 1993 c g
 Sapromyza analis Macquart, 1846 c g
 Sapromyza annulifera Malloch, 1929 c g
 Sapromyza annulipes Macquart, 1851 c g
 Sapromyza antennata Becker, 1895 c g
 Sapromyza apicalis Loew, 1847
 Sapromyza appula (Walker, 1849) c g
 Sapromyza arctophila Shatalkin, 1993 c g
 Sapromyza ardesiaca Shatalkin, 1993 c g
 Sapromyza arenaria Tonnoir & Malloch, 1926 c g
 Sapromyza argus Macquart, 1846 c g
 Sapromyza arkitana Shatalkin, 1999 c g
 Sapromyza atrimana Malloch, 1928 c g
 Sapromyza atripes (Meigen, 1838) c g
 Sapromyza atrivena Shewell, 1971 c g
 Sapromyza aureocapitata Malloch, 1926 c g
 Sapromyza avicola Malloch, 1927 c g
 Sapromyza basalis Zetterstedt, 1847
 Sapromyza basipunctata Kertesz, 1900 c g
 Sapromyza beccarii Kertesz, 1900 c g
 Sapromyza beckeriana Baez, 2000 c g
 Sapromyza bergenstammi (Czerny, 1932) c g
 Sapromyza bergi Shatalkin, 1993 c g
 Sapromyza binotata Macquart, 1835 c g
 Sapromyza biordinata Czerny, 1932 c g
 Sapromyza bipunctata Say, 1829 c g
 Sapromyza biscoitoi Baez, 2001 c g
 Sapromyza bisigillata Rondani, 1868
 Sapromyza blanchardi Malloch, 1933 c g
 Sapromyza brachysoma Coquillett, 1898 i c g b
 Sapromyza brasiliensis Walker, 1853 c g
 Sapromyza brunneovittata Malloch, 1926 c g
 Sapromyza brunnitarsis Macquart, 1835 c g
 Sapromyza cabrilsensis Carles-Tolra, 1993 c g
 Sapromyza caeruleophthalmica (Scopoli, 1763) c g
 Sapromyza carinatula Shatalkin, 1992 c g
 Sapromyza cerata Shatalkin, 1996 c g
 Sapromyza chiloensis Malloch, 1933 c g
 Sapromyza chlorophthalma Zetterstedt, 1838 c g
 Sapromyza cincitventris Czerny, 1932 c g
 Sapromyza cinctipes (Meijere, 1910) c g
 Sapromyza cinerea (Robineau-Desvoidy, 1830) c g
 Sapromyza citrina Shatalkin, 1993 c g
 Sapromyza citrinella Shatalkin, 1996 c g
 Sapromyza claripennis (Robineau-Desvoidy, 1830) c g
 Sapromyza clathrata Shatalkin, 1993 c g
 Sapromyza columbi Frey, 1936
 Sapromyza connexa (Say, 1829) c g
 Sapromyza conspicua Malloch, 1929 c g
 Sapromyza ctenophora Sasakawa, 2001 c g
 Sapromyza cyclops Melander, 1913 i c g
 Sapromyza delicatula Blanchard, 1852 c g
 Sapromyza dichromata Walker, 1849 c g
 Sapromyza dichromocera Czerny, 1933 c g
 Sapromyza discontinua Bezzi, 1928 c g
 Sapromyza dispersa (Pandelle, 1902) c g
 Sapromyza dorsalis Macquart, 1835 c g
 Sapromyza drahamensis Villeneuve, 1921 c g
 Sapromyza dubiella Evenhuis, 1989 c g
 Sapromyza duodecimvittata (Frey, 1918) c g
 Sapromyza edwardsi Malloch, 1933 c g
 Sapromyza elegans Kertesz, 1900 c g
 Sapromyza emmesa Malloch, 1933 c g
 Sapromyza erimae Kertesz, 1900 c g
 Sapromyza eronis Curran, 1934 c g
 Sapromyza exul Williston, 1896 c g
 Sapromyza faciatifrons (Kertesz, 1913) g
 Sapromyza fasciatifrons (Kertesz, 1913) c g
 Sapromyza femoralis (Robineau-Desvoidy, 1830) c g
 Sapromyza ferdinandi (Frey, 1919) c g
 Sapromyza ferganica Shatalkin, 1996 c g
 Sapromyza ferruginea (Macquart, 1848) c g
 Sapromyza flava (Robineau-Desvoidy, 1830) c
 Sapromyza flavimana Malloch, 1926 c g
 Sapromyza flavipes (Robineau-Desvoidy, 1830) c g
 Sapromyza flavodorsalis Malloch, 1927 c g
 Sapromyza flavopleura Malloch, 1927 c g
 Sapromyza freidbergi Yarom, 1990 c g
 Sapromyza frontalis Macquart, 1843 c g
 Sapromyza fulvicornis Malloch, 1933 c g
 Sapromyza fuscidula Shatalkin, 1993 c g
 Sapromyza fuscocostata Malloch, 1925 c g
 Sapromyza fuscolimbata Malloch, 1926 c g
 Sapromyza fuscotestacea Zetterstedt, 1849 c g
 Sapromyza geniculata Macquart, 1843 c g
 Sapromyza gestroi Kertesz, 1900 c g
 Sapromyza gibbosa Thomson, 1869 c g
 Sapromyza gomerensis Baez, 2000 c g
 Sapromyza gozmanyi Papp, 1981 c g
 Sapromyza griseadorsalis Malloch, 1926 c g
 Sapromyza grossipes (Robineau-Desvoidy, 1830) c g
 Sapromyza guttulata Macquart, 1846 c g
 Sapromyza halidayi Shatalkin, 2000 c g
 Sapromyza hardii Lower, 1953 c g
 Sapromyza helomyzoides Becker, 1919 c g
 Sapromyza hermonensis Yarom, 1990 c g
 Sapromyza hieroglyphica Malloch, 1927 c g
 Sapromyza hierrensis Baez, 2000 c g
 Sapromyza hirtiloba Frey, 1949
 Sapromyza hissarica Shatalkin, 1996 c g
 Sapromyza hyalinata (Meigen, 1826)
 Sapromyza hyalipennis (Meijere, 1914) c g
 Sapromyza hypocrita Kertesz, 1900 c g
 Sapromyza imitans Baez, 2001 c g
 Sapromyza immaculipes Malloch, 1926 c g
 Sapromyza impar Kertesz, 1900 c g
 Sapromyza impunctata (Robineau-Desvoidy, 1830) c g
 Sapromyza incidens Curran, 1934 c g
 Sapromyza inconspicua Baez, 2001 c g
 Sapromyza indigena Becker, 1908
 Sapromyza infumata Becker, 1908
 Sapromyza ingrata Williston, 1896 c g
 Sapromyza innuba Giglio-Tos, 1893 c g
 Sapromyza insolita Shatalkin, 1993 c g
 Sapromyza insularis (Schiner, 1868) c g
 Sapromyza interiecta Walker, 1849 c g
 Sapromyza interjecta (Walker, 1849) c
 Sapromyza intonsa Loew, 1847
 Sapromyza intonsina Yarom, 1990 c g
 Sapromyza inversa Malloch, 1929 c g
 Sapromyza invertebrata Bezzi, 1928 c g
 Sapromyza israelis Yarom, 1990 c g
 Sapromyza kabuli Papp, 1979 c g
 Sapromyza krivosheinae Shatalkin, 1999 c g
 Sapromyza laevatrispina Carles-Tolra, 1992 c g
 Sapromyza lancifera Malloch, 1926 c g
 Sapromyza laszlopappi Merz, 2007 c g
 Sapromyza latelimbata Macquart, 1855 c g
 Sapromyza lateralis Walker, 1853 c g
 Sapromyza lateritia Rondani, 1863 c g
 Sapromyza laticincta Shatalkin, 1999 c g
 Sapromyza laurisilvae Baez, 2001 c g
 Sapromyza lebasii Macquart, 1843 c g
 Sapromyza leptoptera (Frey, 1919) c g
 Sapromyza lichtwardti Malloch, 1930 c g
 Sapromyza limbinerva Rondani, 1848 c g
 Sapromyza lineata (Walker, 1853) c g
 Sapromyza lineatocollis Blanchard, 1852 c g
 Sapromyza lineatus Williston, 1896 c
 Sapromyza longimentula Sasakawa, 2001 c g
 Sapromyza lopesi Shewell, 1989 c g
 Sapromyza lorentzi (Meijere, 1913) c g
 Sapromyza loriae Kertesz, 1900 c g
 Sapromyza lupulinoides Williston, 1897 c g
 Sapromyza macrochaeta Shatalkin, 1999 c g
 Sapromyza maculipennis Loew, 1847 c g
 Sapromyza madeirensis Frey, 1949
 Sapromyza maghrebi Papp, 1981 c g
 Sapromyza magnifica Malloch, 1926 c g
 Sapromyza mallochi (Hendel, 1932) c g
 Sapromyza mallochiana Evenhuis & Okadome, 1989 c g
 Sapromyza maquilingensis Malloch, 1929 c g
 Sapromyza marginalis (Walker, 1858) c g
 Sapromyza mariae Malloch, 1927 c g
 Sapromyza mauli Baez, 2001 c g
 Sapromyza melanocephala (Kertesz, 1915) c g
 Sapromyza melanura Zetterstedt, 1847 c g
 Sapromyza metallica Walker, 1853 c g
 Sapromyza micropyga Malloch, 1933 c g
 Sapromyza mikii Strobl, 1892
 Sapromyza minuta Kertesz, 1900 c g
 Sapromyza mollis (Robineau-Desvoidy, 1830) c g
 Sapromyza mongolorum Remm & El'berg, 1980 c g
 Sapromyza monticola Melander, 1913 i c g
 Sapromyza montis Becker, 1914 c g
 Sapromyza morokana Kertesz, 1900 c g
 Sapromyza multimaculata Yarom, 1990 c g
 Sapromyza multiseriata Czerny, 1932
 Sapromyza neozelandica Tonnoir & Malloch, 1926
 Sapromyza nigerrima Becker, 1919 c g
 Sapromyza nigrans (Melander, 1913) i c g
 Sapromyza nigriceps Macquart, 1851 c g
 Sapromyza nigricornis (Robineau-Desvoidy, 1830) c g
 Sapromyza nigrifrontata Becker, 1919 c g
 Sapromyza nigripalpus (Walker, 1849) i c g
 Sapromyza nigripes Macquart, 1843 c g
 Sapromyza nigriventris Blanchard, 1852 c g
 Sapromyza nigroapicata Malloch, 1926 c g
 Sapromyza nitida Czerny, 1932
 Sapromyza novempunctata Gimmerthal, 1847 c g
 Sapromyza nudiseta Shatalkin, 1999 c g
 Sapromyza nudiuscula Lamb, 1912 c g
 Sapromyza obesa Zetterstedt, 1847
 Sapromyza obscuripennis Loew, 1847 c g
 Sapromyza obsoleta Fallén, 1820
 Sapromyza obsuripennis Loew, 1847
 Sapromyza occipitalis Malloch, 1926 c g
 Sapromyza octopuncta Wiedemann, 1830 c g
 Sapromyza oestrachion Schiner, 1868 c g
 Sapromyza ombriosa Baez, 2000 c g
 Sapromyza opaca Becker, 1895
 Sapromyza ornata Schiner, 1868 c g
 Sapromyza pallens Blanchard, 1852 c g
 Sapromyza pallida Fallen, 1820 c g
 Sapromyza pallidicornis Loew, 1857 c g
 Sapromyza palmensis Baez, 2000 c g
 Sapromyza palpella Rondani, 1868
 Sapromyza palustris (Robineau-Desvoidy, 1830) c g
 Sapromyza parallela Carles-Tolra, 1992 c g
 Sapromyza paramerata Shatalkin, 1993 c g
 Sapromyza parviceps Malloch, 1926 c g
 Sapromyza parvula Blanchard, 1852 c g
 Sapromyza pellopleura Sasakawa, 2001 c g
 Sapromyza persica Shatalkin, 1996 c g
 Sapromyza persimillima Harrison, 1959 c g
 Sapromyza peterseni Malloch, 1927 c g
 Sapromyza picea Shatalkin, 1996 c g
 Sapromyza picrula Williston, 1897 c g
 Sapromyza picticornis (Curran, 1942) c g
 Sapromyza pictigera Malloch, 1935 c g
 Sapromyza pilifrons Malloch, 1926 c g
 Sapromyza pistaciphila Shatalkin, 1993 c g
 Sapromyza placida Meigen, 1830 c g
 Sapromyza plana (Curran, 1942) c g
 Sapromyza plantaris Thomson, 1869 c g
 Sapromyza pleuralis (Kertesz, 1913) c g
 Sapromyza plumiseta Malloch, 1927 c g
 Sapromyza poecilogastra (Meijere, 1916) c g
 Sapromyza pollinifrons Malloch, 1927 c g
 Sapromyza pseudohyalinata Papp, 2004 c g
 Sapromyza pseudopaca Shatalkin, 1993 c g
 Sapromyza pseudovirilis Shewell, 1971 c g
 Sapromyza puella Williston, 1896 c g
 Sapromyza pulchripennis Kertesz, 1900 c g
 Sapromyza punctata (Robineau-Desvoidy, 1830) c g
 Sapromyza punctigera (Doleschall, 1858) g
 Sapromyza punctiseta Malloch, 1925 c g
 Sapromyza punctulata Kertesz, 1900 c g
 Sapromyza pusillima (Meijere, 1914) c g
 Sapromyza quadrangulata (Meijere, 1924) c g
 Sapromyza quadrata Bezzi, 1908 c g
 Sapromyza quadricincta Becker, 1895 c g
 Sapromyza quadridentata Sasakawa, 2001 c g
 Sapromyza quadripunctata (Linnaeus, 1767) c g
 Sapromyza quadristrigata Kertesz, 1900 c g
 Sapromyza quichuana Brèthes, 1922 c g
 Sapromyza quinquepunctata Kertesz, 1900 c g
 Sapromyza quyanensis Macquart, 1843 c g
 Sapromyza ratzii Kertesz, 1900 c g
 Sapromyza ravida Shatalkin, 1996 c g
 Sapromyza recurrens (Meijere, 1913) c g
 Sapromyza regalis Malloch, 1926 c g
 Sapromyza remmae Shatalkin, 1996 c g
 Sapromyza remota Thomson, 1869 c g
 Sapromyza rhodesiella Curran, 1938 c g
 Sapromyza ringens Loew, 1862 c g
 Sapromyza riparia Malloch, 1927 c g
 Sapromyza roberti Meigen, 1838 c g
 Sapromyza romanovi Shatalkin, 1996 c g
 Sapromyza rotundicornis Loew, 1863 i c g b
 Sapromyza rubescens Macquart, 1843 c g
 Sapromyza rubricornis Becker, 1907 c g
 Sapromyza rufifrons (Walker, 1853) c g
 Sapromyza schnabli Papp, 1987 c g
 Sapromyza schwarzi Malloch, 1928 c g
 Sapromyza sciomyzina Schiner, 1868 c g
 Sapromyza scutellaris (Williston, 1896) c g
 Sapromyza semiatra Malloch, 1933 c g
 Sapromyza septemnotata Sasakawa, 2001 c g
 Sapromyza setiventris Zetterstedt, 1847
 Sapromyza setosa Thomson, 1869 c g
 Sapromyza sexlituris Shatalkin, 1993 c g
 Sapromyza sexmaculata Sasakawa, 2001 c g
 Sapromyza sexnotata Zetterstedt, 1847 c g
 Sapromyza sexpunctata Meigen, 1826
 Sapromyza shannoni Malloch, 1933 c g
 Sapromyza shewelli Evenhuis, 1989 c g
 Sapromyza sicca Becker, 1914 c g
 Sapromyza simillima Tonnoir & Malloch, 1926 c g
 Sapromyza simplicior Hendel, 1908
 Sapromyza simplicipes Czerny, 1932 c g
 Sapromyza sonax Giglio-Tos, 1893 c g
 Sapromyza sordida Haliday, 1833 c g
 Sapromyza sororia Williston, 1896 i c g
 Sapromyza sorosia Williston, 1896 c g
 Sapromyza speciosa Remm & El'berg, 1980 c g
 Sapromyza spinigera Malloch, 1933 c g
 Sapromyza stata Giglio-Tos, 1893 c g
 Sapromyza stigmatica Malloch, 1926 c g
 Sapromyza strahani Malloch, 1927 c g
 Sapromyza strigillifera Shatalkin, 1993 c g
 Sapromyza stroblii Kertesz, 1900 c g
 Sapromyza suavis Loew, 1847 c g
 Sapromyza suffusa Malloch, 1926 c g
 Sapromyza takagii Elberg, 1993 c g
 Sapromyza talyshensis Shatalkin, 1999 c g
 Sapromyza tarsella Zetterstedt, 1847 c g
 Sapromyza tenebricosa Lindner, 1956 c g
 Sapromyza teneriffensis Frey, 1936
 Sapromyza ternatensis Kertesz, 1900 c g
 Sapromyza thoracica (Robineau-Desvoidy, 1830) c g
 Sapromyza tinguarrae Frey, 1936
 Sapromyza tonnoiri Malloch, 1927 c g
 Sapromyza transcaspica Shatalkin, 2000 c g
 Sapromyza transcaucasica Czerny, 1932 c g
 Sapromyza transformata Becker, 1908
 Sapromyza triloba Malloch, 1933 c g
 Sapromyza trinotata Costa, 1844 c g
 Sapromyza triseriata Coquillett, 1904 c g
 Sapromyza tuberculosa Becker, 1895
 Sapromyza ultima Baez, 2001 c g
 Sapromyza umbraculata (Robineau-Desvoidy, 1830) c g
 Sapromyza undulata Merz, 2007 c g
 Sapromyza unicolorata Malloch, 1926 c g
 Sapromyza unizona Hendel, 1908
 Sapromyza urbana Malloch, 1927 c g
 Sapromyza variventris Malloch, 1926 c g
 Sapromyza venusta Williston, 1896 c g
 Sapromyza verena Becker, 1919 c g
 Sapromyza viciespunctata Czerny, 1932
 Sapromyza vicina Meijere, 1907 c g
 Sapromyza vicispunctata Czerny, 1932 c g
 Sapromyza victoriae Malloch, 1925 c g
 Sapromyza vinnula Giglio-Tos, 1893 c g
 Sapromyza virescens (Macquart, 1851) c g
 Sapromyza vittata (Frey, 1917) c g
 Sapromyza vumbella Curran, 1938 c g
 Sapromyza xanthiceps Williston, 1897 c g
 Sapromyza xenia Malloch, 1935 c g
 Sapromyza zebra (Kertesz, 1913) c g
 Sapromyza zetterstedti Hendel, 1908
 Sapromyza ziminae Shatalkin, 1996 c g
 Sapromyza zlobini Shatalkin, 1999 c g

Data sources: i = ITIS, c = Catalogue of Life, g = GBIF, b = Bugguide.net

References

Sapromyza